Allison Winston DeLong (December 4, 1940 - April 14, 2014) was a Canadian politician. He served in the Legislative Assembly of New Brunswick from 1987 to 1995, as a Liberal member for the constituency of Carleton Centre.

Electoral record

References

New Brunswick Liberal Association MLAs
1940 births
2014 deaths
People from Carleton County, New Brunswick